Sir William Parsons, 2nd Baronet (8 June 1661 – 17 March 1741) was an Anglo-Irish politician. 

Parsons was the son of Sir Laurence Parsons, 1st Baronet and Frances Savage, and succeeded to his father's baronetcy in 1698. He was the Member of Parliament for King's County in the Irish House of Commons between 1692 and 1713, and then again from 1715 until his death in 1741. He was succeeded in his title by his grandson, Laurence Parsons.

References

1661 births
1741 deaths
17th-century Anglo-Irish people
18th-century Anglo-Irish people
Baronets in the Baronetage of Ireland
Irish MPs 1692–1693
Irish MPs 1695–1699
Irish MPs 1703–1713
Irish MPs 1715–1727
Irish MPs 1727–1760
Members of the Parliament of Ireland (pre-1801) for King's County constituencies